Lukas Hellum Lilleengen (born 15 November 2000) is a Norwegian tennis player.

Hellum Lilleengen has a career high ATP singles ranking of 1080 achieved on 29 August 2022. He also has a career high ATP doubles ranking of 1257 achieved on 3 October 2022.

Hellum Lilleengen represents Norway at the Davis Cup, where he has a W/L record of 1–1.

References

External links

2000 births
Living people
Norwegian male tennis players
Sportspeople from Oslo
Sportspeople from the canton of Geneva
21st-century Norwegian people